Font Book is a font manager by Apple Inc. for its macOS operating system. It was first released with Mac OS X Panther in 2003.

Features
It is opened by default whenever the user clicks on a new .otf or .ttf font file. The user can view the font and install it, at which point the font will be copied to a centralised folder of user-installed fonts and be available for all apps to use. 

It may also be used as a browser of all installed fonts. The user may view the list of fonts and see their alphabets, their complete repertoire of characters or how they set a sample text of the user's choice.

The program also allows users to:

 Group fonts into collections, which can then be used in all Cocoa programs.
 View details of fonts, such as their designer’s name.
 Activate/deactivate individual fonts or collections.
 Check the data integrity of font files.
 Export font collections for use on another computer

It does not feature any editing tools, even for changing font properties. This means that the user cannot use it to rename, merge or split up fonts or to redesign or modify fonts by (for example) changing kerning rules or exporting small capitals into a separate style.

In the 2003–2007 period, Apple's Font Book faced some criticism regarding an inability to validate and auto-activate fonts. These features were added to Font Book with the release of Mac OS X Leopard.

References

External links 
 Apple's Font Book user guide
 Font Book 101 from Apple

MacOS
MacOS-only software made by Apple Inc.
Font managers
Products introduced in 2003